
Room to Grow is the third CD by Nashville, Tennessee-based singer/songwriter Adrienne Young.

Track listing

Personnel
 Dale Ann Bradley - vocal harmony
 Neil Cleary - drums
 Mike Gordon - bass, vocals
 Andy Hall - resonator guitar
 Craig Harmon - organ (Hammond, Wurlitzer)
 Hans Holzen - acoustic guitar, electric guitar
 Kyle Kegerreis - acoustic bass
 Will Kimbrough - acoustic guitar, electric guitar, resonator guitar, vocal harmony 
 Eric Merrill - banjo, fiddle, harmony, vocal
 Edward O'Day - acoustic guitar, electric guitar
 Jason Oettel - bass, acoustic bass
 Gordon Stone - pedal steel
 Adrienne Young - banjo, acoustic guitar, vocals

Room to Grow
Room to Grow